Acianthera caldensis is a species of orchid plant native to Brazil.

References 

caldensis
Flora of Brazil]